McCrae, Victoria is a suburb of Melbourne, Australia.

McCrae may also refer to:

People
McCrae (surname)

Places
McCrae Homestead, a historic property in McCrae, Victoria
McCrae, Ontario, a community in Addington Highlands, Ontario, Canada
McCrae House, birthplace of Canadian poet John McCrae
John McCrae Secondary School, a public secondary school in Nepean, Ontario, Canada
McCrea, Louisiana

See also
MacRae (disambiguation)
McRae (disambiguation)
McCray (disambiguation)